Maseese (Se'e) David Solomona (born 9 March 1965) is a New Zealand former professional rugby league footballer who represented both New Zealand and Western Samoa.

Background
Solomona was born in New Zealand.

Playing career
Solomona started his career with the Richmond Bulldogs, and the Glenora Bears, playing 21 games for Auckland between 1988 and 1993. Solomona spent 1989 with the Canterbury-Bankstown Bulldogs as part of the New Zealand Rugby League's "Rookie Scheme".

Solomona played the majority of his career in England. He played for Oldham from 1992 to 1994. before returning home to play for the Auckland Warriors in their début season in the Australian Rugby League competition. He spent 1996 with the North Queensland Cowboys, and still resides in Australia.

Representative career
Solomona represented the Kiwi Colts in 1991.

His four tests for the New Zealand national rugby league team came in 1993. He also represented Western Samoa at the 1990 Pacific Cup, and in the 1995 World Cup.

Personal life

References

External links
Statistics at orl-heritagetrust.org.uk

1965 births
Living people
Auckland rugby league team players
Expatriate rugby league players in Australia
Glenora Bears players
New Zealand expatriate rugby league players
New Zealand expatriate sportspeople in Australia
New Zealand national rugby league team players
New Zealand sportspeople of Samoan descent
New Zealand rugby league players
New Zealand Warriors players
North Queensland Cowboys players
Oldham R.L.F.C. players
Place of birth missing (living people)
Richmond Bulldogs players
Rugby league props
Samoa national rugby league team players
Samoan sportspeople
Sheffield Eagles (1984) players
Se'e
Widnes Vikings players